The Into the Wild Tour (also known as Hurricane Tour and the Closer to the Edge Tour) was the second worldwide concert tour by American rock band Thirty Seconds to Mars in  support of the band's third studio album, This Is War. The tour reached the Americas, Europe, Africa, Asia and Australasia over a two-year period and it marks the first major concert tour the band has performed in North America and Australia. Along with playing arenas and amphitheatres, the tour headlined at several festivals in Europe and Australia. The tour's namesake derives from a song entitled, "The Mission", that appears on the band's eponymous debut album.

Background
The tour was announced in November 2009 chronicling tour dates in England and Scotland. Within the following months, the tour was expanded to include additional dates in Europe, as well as, North America and Australia. In an interview with MTV News, frontman Jared Leto described the tour as an emotional celebration stating, 

Leto updated fans on the tour via Twitter, where we would post status updates and pictures of rehearsals. On MARS' official website provide printable flyers for each gigs so fans and spectators can help promote the concert for their area. Additionally, the band created a weekly blog for MTV Transmission to chronicle behind the scenes adventures.

Guinness World Record
On October 16, 2011, 30 Seconds to Mars announced that they planned to break the world record for most live shows during a single album cycle, with 300 shows. The 300th show took place on December 7, 2011, and the date marked the two-year anniversary of the album's release in the UK and other parts of Europe and ended a special week-long series of shows in New York and mark the end of the Into the Wild Tour.

VyRT
On the 24th November 2011, Jared posted on his Twitter page "The second secret is coming soon! #VyRT". This caused strong speculation within the echelon about various possible meanings; the most discussed that the Mars300 show would be streamed live for fans around the world. This turned out to be correct. 30 Seconds to Mars joined with uStream so that the Mars300 show would be streamed in HD around the world, including backstage footage and q + a sessions. This is the first time this has taken place.

Opening act

Lostalone (Europe—Leg 1) (select dates)
Street Drum Corps (Europe—Leg 1) (North America—Leg 1) (select dates)
Fox Avenue (Ireland—February 2010)
Carpark North (Europe—Leg 1) (select dates)
Neon Trees (North America—Leg 1 and Leg 2) (select dates)
Mutemath (North America—Leg 1) (select dates)
Shiny Toy Guns (Los Angeles—May 2010)
New Politics (North America—Leg 2) (select dates)
Violent Soho (North America—Leg 2) (select dates)
BLK JKS (Africa—Leg 1)
Enter Shikari  (Europe—Leg 3) (select dates)
Funeral Party (Europe—Leg 3) (select dates)

Setlist

Tour dates

Music festivals and other miscellaneous performances

Cancellations and rescheduled shows

Broadcasts and recordings
Taken from their third album, the single Closer to the Edge was released with a video that consisted of footage recorded at various concerts, appearances and festivals from the Into the Wild tour. The footage ranged from the 1st of the 300 live shows in Nottingham, England and until the shows of June 2010. The video contains interviews of fans conducted by Jared Leto backstage at various concerts.

Critical reception
Scott Kara (The New Zealand Herald) criticized the show stating Leto was the main focus of the night however, he did enjoy the band's performance. He said, "The thing is, with that mohawk and his constant 'New Zealand we love you' plaudits, 30 Seconds To Mars are more about style, showmanship, and crowd participation over substance."
Fiona McKinlay (The Herald) praised MARS' performance in Scotland stating,"From the opening run of Escape and Night Of The Hunter to the gentle comedown that 100 Suns provided, the newer songs aspire to the same monstrous, theatrical brilliance, but quite simply do it better. They’ve grown into a more intense, more poignant, and more unpredictable force."
Sandra Bahbah (Perth Now) wrote the performance was long-awaited but felt the show wasn't what many expected. She states, "Vocally, Leto was strong throughout the show, hitting all the high notes. The one gripe was how he kept getting the crowd to sing and sometimes they just didn't know the words. It would have been better if he had just sang a song all the way through. While his voice was loud, at times it was drowned out by the instruments, but there was no denying the stage presence of the trio and how good they were at entertaining the masses."
Tanya Vega (Chicago Music Guide) was blown away by MARS' performance at the Aragon Ballroom stating, "Un-expect the unexpected from Jared and the guys ...meaning, it'll be hard to predict what will happen next at the Mars concert you attend compared to what happened tonight in Chicago."

References

External links

MARS Official Website
MARS MySpace
MARS Facebook

2010 concert tours
2011 concert tours
Thirty Seconds to Mars concert tours